Corina Claudia Corduneanu (born 8 February 1988) is a Romanian former tennis player.

She started played tennis at the age of seven. On 12 June 2006, she reached her career-high singles ranking of world No. 305. On 12 September 2005, she peaked at No. 389 in the doubles rankings. She won six singles and ten doubles titles on the ITF Women's Circuit.

Career
In July 2005, she won her first professional singles title at the $10k event in Bucharest beating compatriot Mihaela Moldovan in the final.

In June 2006 won singles title at the $25k event in Galatina beating compatriot uzbek Iroda Tulyaganova in the final. Corduneanu played on the WTA Tour in 2006 in qualifying for Palermo. She retired from professional tennis in 2008.

ITF finals

Singles: 9 (6–3)

Doubles: 10 (10–0)

Ranking history

References

External links
 
 

1988 births
Living people
People from Timișoara
Romanian female tennis players
21st-century Romanian women